Daisuke Takahashi is a full professor of computer science at the University of Tsukuba, specializing in high-performance numerical computing.

Education and career
Takahashi received a bachelor's degree in engineering in 1993 and a master's degree in engineering in 1995, both from Toyohashi University of Technology. He completed a Ph.D. in information science from the University of Tokyo in 1999. After working as a researcher at the University of Tokyo and at Saitama University, he joined the University of Tsukuba in 2001.

Research
Takahashi's works include several records of the number of digits of the approximation of Pi. His work on the computation of Pi has inspired his former student Emma Haruka Iwao, who broke a new record on March 14, 2019.

In 2011, he was part of a team from the University of Tsukuba that won the Gordon Bell Prize of the Association for Computing Machinery for their work simulating the quantum states of a nanowire using the K computer.

He is also known for his research on the Fast Fourier transform, and is one of the developers of the HPC Challenge Benchmark.

References

External links

Living people
Year of birth missing (living people)
20th-century Japanese mathematicians
21st-century Japanese mathematicians
Academic staff of the University of Tsukuba
Toyohashi University of Technology alumni
University of Tokyo alumni
Place of birth missing (living people)